Bharat Bhushan Tyagi (born 1954) is an Indian farmer, educator and trainer from Bulandshahr, Uttar Pradesh, who was awarded the Padma Shri, the fourth highest civilian award in India, in 2019. He organises weekly training for farmers at Bulandshahr and has trained over 80,000 farmers. He is also a recipient of Progressive Farmer Award by the Prime Minister, Narendra Modi.

Education and career
He is a science graduate from Delhi University. Tyagi has also worked with government associations like National Centre of Organic Farming, International Competence Centre for Organic Agriculture (ICCOA), Ministry of Agriculture (India), AFC, and National Bank for Agriculture and Rural Development.

Awards and recognition 
 Padma Shri, 2019 
 Prime Minister's Progressive Farmer Award

See also 

 List of Padma Shri award recipients (2010–2019)

References

Indian activists
Indian farmers
Recipients of the Padma Shri
People from Uttar Pradesh
Living people
1954 births